Crocidium is a small North American genus of plants in the daisy family. Crocidium is native to western North America: British Columbia Washington, Idaho, Oregon, and California.

Crocidium can be found in varied habitats from grassland to woodland. It is a small annual, typically not exceeding 30 centimeters (12 inches) in height. It grows from a small patch of somewhat fleshy leaves at the ground and erects several very tall, very thin gangly stems, each of which is topped with a flower head. The flower head is made up of five to 13 lemon yellow ray florets, each up to a centimeter long. The center of the head is filled with tiny disc florets, in a similar shade of bright yellow. The fruits are fuzzy brown achenes only one or two millimeters long which turn gluey when wet.

 Species
 Crocidium multicaule Hook. - British Columbia, Washington, Idaho, Oregon, California
 Crocidium pugetense H.St.John - British Columbia, Washington

References

External links
 Jepson Manual Treatment
 Calphotos Photo gallery, University of California

Senecioneae
Flora of North America
Asteraceae genera